Edvan França de Moraes, known as just Edvan born in São Paulo, is a right back who plays in the Santo André.

Career
 Played in the Grêmio Prudente.
 Set to move to Santo André in January 2011.

Career statistics
(Correct )

Contract
 Grêmio Prudente.

See also
Football in Brazil
List of football clubs in Brazil

References

External links
 ogol
 soccerway

1990 births
Living people
Brazilian footballers
Association football defenders
Grêmio Barueri Futebol players
Footballers from São Paulo